Civil War Memorial may refer to:

African American Civil War Memorial, Washington, D.C.
 U Street (WMATA station), which contains "African-American Civil War Memorial/Cardozo" in its subtitle.
Civil War Memorial (Adrian, Michigan)
Civil War Memorial (Savannah, Georgia)
Civil War Memorial (Sycamore, Illinois)
Civil War Memorial (Webster, Massachusetts)
Jewish Civil War Memorial (Cincinnati, Ohio)

See also
List of Union Civil War monuments and memorials
List of Confederate monuments and memorials